William Harrison Marsh (1931, Pennsylvania–September 26, 2017, Mitchellville, MD) was the United States Ambassador to the United Nations Agencies for Food and Agriculture from July 24, 1992, until September 4, 1994.

Marsh graduated from Cornell University in 1953 with a degree in government and an MPA in 1957 from Princeton's Woodrow Wilson School after spending two years in the Air Force.

References

Cornell University alumni
Princeton School of Public and International Affairs alumni
Representatives of the United States to the United Nations Agencies for Food and Agriculture